Listening to Pictures is a studio album by Jon Hassell. It was released on his own record label, Ndeya, on June 8, 2018. It peaked at number 34 on the UK Dance Albums Chart, as well as number 34 on the UK Independent Albums Chart.

Critical reception
At Metacritic, which assigns a weighted average score out of 100 to reviews from mainstream critics, the album received an average score of 84% based on 10 reviews, indicating "universal acclaim".

John Lewis of The Guardian gave the album 4 stars out of 5, saying, "Hassell's electronic soundscapes recall the work of Oneohtrix Point Never, Boards of Canada or Aphex Twin." He added, "Hassell is into exploring the multiple layers that exist in his sound, what he calls 'vertical listening' – and this is certainly dense, endlessly mutating music that rewards multiple listenings." Dave Beech of The Independent gave the album 4 stars out of 5, saying, "it's not an album that strives for immediacy, but is best soaked in over multiple listens." Robert Ham of Pitchfork gave the album a 7.3 out of 10, saying: "Its eight tracks are teeming with strands of melody and unbound rhythms that have been meticulously constructed into groaning towers of sound."

Track listing

Personnel
Credits adapted from liner notes.

Musicians
 Jon Hassell – trumpet, keyboards, orchestration
 Rick Cox – guitar, synthesizer, electronics
 John von Seggern – bass guitar, drums, electronics
 Hugh Marsh – electric violin, electronics
 Peter Freeman – bass guitar, electronics (2, 3, 7)
 Ralph Cumbers – drum programming (2)
 Christoph Harbonnier – bass guitar (3)
 Christian Jacob – bass guitar (3)
 Michel Redolfi – electronics (3)
 Eivind Aarset – electric guitar, sampler (8)
 Kheir-Eddine M'Kachiche – violin, sampler (8)

Technical personnel
 Jon Hassell – production
 Rick Cox – co-production
 Matthew Jones – executive production
 Britton Powell – coordination
 Al Carlson – mastering
 Arnaud Mercier – additional mastering
 Valgeir Sigurðsson – additional mastering
 Dan Kuehn – art direction
 Arien Valizadeh – art direction
 Taska Cleveland – art direction
 Mati Klarwein – album art sources, inspiration
 Petra Gehrmann – publishing

Charts

References

External links
 

2018 albums
Jon Hassell albums
Albums with cover art by Mati Klarwein